General somatic fibers may refer to:

 General somatic afferent fibers
 General somatic efferent fibers